Clear Lake Forest is an EP album by American band The Black Angels. It was released in July 2014 under Blue Horizon Records.

Track list

References

2014 EPs
The Black Angels (band) albums
Blue Horizon Records albums